Juan Carlos Kayser Cruz (born 22 July 1996) is a Mexican professional footballer who plays as a midfielder.

He played with Atlético Veracruz  of the Liga de Balompié Mexicano during the league's inaugural season, leading them to a runners-up finish after losing to Chapulineros de Oaxaca in the finals.

References

External links

Living people
1996 births
People from Veracruz (city)
Mexican footballers
Footballers from Veracruz
Association football midfielders
Liga MX players
Liga Premier de México players
C.D. Veracruz footballers
Albinegros de Orizaba footballers
Inter Playa del Carmen players
Liga de Balompié Mexicano players